The Military Academy of the Bolivarian Aviation (in Spanish Academia Militar de la Aviación Bolivariana), is an academy to train members of the officer corps of the Bolivarian Venezuelan Military Aviation. Based in Maracay, it has been active since 1920, and is one of the oldest air force academies ever to be established.

Curriculum and academic programs 
Like many military academies in the world, the MABAV is a medium-sized, highly residential baccalaureate college, with a full-time, four-year undergraduate program that emphasizes instruction in the arts, sciences, and professions with no graduate program, preparing men and women to take on the challenge of being officers of the Venezuelan Air Force. The academy is accredited by the Ministry of Higher Education.

Academic program 
The academic program consists of a structured core of subjects depending on the cadet's chosen specialty as a future Air Force officer, balanced between the arts and sciences. Regardless of chosen major, all cadets graduate with a Bachelor of Science degree. The specialties are:

 Air Operations
 Air Defense
 Military Intelligence
 Air Logistics and Materiel
 Administration

References

Bolivarian Military University of Venezuela